is a passenger railway station located in the city of Hachiōji, Tokyo, Japan, operated by East Japan Railway Company (JR East).

Lines
The station is 49.8 kilometers from Tokyo Station.

Station layout
The station consists of two ground-level opposed side platforms serving two tracks with the platforms connected by the elevated station building, which is located above and perpendicular to the tracks. The station is attended.

Platforms

History
Nishi-Hachiōji Station opened on 1 April 1939. With the privatization of Japanese National Railways (JNR) on 1 April 1987, the station came under the control of JR East. The original station building was destroyed in an air raid on 2 August 1945.

Passenger statistics
In fiscal 2019, the station was used by an average of 31,823 passengers daily (boarding passengers only).

The passenger figures (boarding passengers only) for previous years are as shown below.

Surrounding area
Hachiōji City Hall
Japan National Route 20
Hosei University - Hachiōji campus

See also
 List of railway stations in Japan

References

External links

 JR East station information 

Railway stations in Japan opened in 1939
Chūō Main Line
Stations of East Japan Railway Company
Railway stations in Tokyo
Buildings and structures in Japan destroyed during World War II